Karrinyup is a suburb of Perth, the capital city of Western Australia, and is located 12 km north of Perth's central business district. Its local government area is the City of Stirling.

History
The name Karrinyup was originally derived from the word Careniup, a Noongar name for a nearby swamp, an Aboriginal word apparently meaning "the place where bush kangaroos graze". It may also mean "the place where spiders are". Moore's grant, Swan Location 92 was surveyed by P Chauncey in 1844 and Chauncey recorded a large swamp just to the east of Karrinyup as Careniup Swamp.

In 1929, the foundation committee developing the Lake Karrinyup Country Club  golf course opted to change the spelling.

While the area had been subdivided by Charles Stoneman in 1904 and roads built, the country club remained the only significant feature in the area, and rapid growth did not begin until 1957, with the part south of Karrinyup Road  developing first.  At this stage, the only access to the area from Perth was via Wanneroo Road and Balcatta Beach Road. The building of the Mitchell Freeway to Karrinyup Road in 1983-84 facilitated the growth of Karrinyup and nearby Stirling as a regional hub.

Geography
Karrinyup is bounded by North Beach Road to the north (Reid Highway is located just a few hundred metres further north), Marmion Avenue to the west, Newborough Street to the south and Huntriss Road and the country club to the east. About one-third of Karrinyup's land area is reserve or bushland, or part of the suburb's two golf courses. Karrinyup Road links Marmion Avenue and West Coast Highway to Mitchell Freeway through the suburb.

At the 2016 Australian census, Karrinyup had a population of 9,283. Most of the houses in Karrinyup are relatively modern, though the prolonged period of development has resulted in a range of styles from various eras. Many of the homes within the suburb are of two storeys and the vast majority are of brick and tile construction.

Facilities
The Karrinyup Shopping Centre contains a bus station, community centre and library as well as two major department stores. It was built in 1973 and has since been extended to offer 54,587 m² of retail accommodation with undercover and open-air parking. A major renovation is expected to be finished in 2021, with plans for apartment towers in the north-east of the complex. It's owned by the superannuation fund Unisuper and managed by AMP. 

Karrinyup has two golf courses, Hamersley (public) and Lake Karrinyup (private). Open spaces exist at Lake Karrinyup and at the south-west of the suburb. Karrinyup contains three state primary schools (Karrinyup, Deanmore and Newborough) and a private college, St Mary's Anglican Girls' School, founded in 1921 at West Perth and relocated to Karrinyup in 1961.

Transport
Karrinyup is served by the Karrinyup bus station, located at the shopping centre, with Transperth bus routes 422, 423, 424 and 425 providing a link to Stirling train station. Further west is a bus depot operated by Swan Transit. All services are operated by Swan Transit.

Politics

Karrinyup is a reasonably affluent suburb with many "mortgage belt" families and socially liberal voters. It consistently supports the Liberal Party at both federal and state elections, although the part south of Karrinyup Road leans more towards the Australian Labor Party.

Notable residents

 Peter Dowding, former Premier of Western Australia (1988 to 1990)
 Dennis Lillee, former Australian cricketer
 Emma Matthews, soprano
 Jeff Newman, former television presenter
 Tim Winton, novelist and National Living Treasure, grew up in Gwelup Street

References

External links
 St Mary's Anglican Girls' School
 Karrinyup Shopping Centre

Suburbs of Perth, Western Australia
Suburbs in the City of Stirling
Karrinyup, Western Australia